Umesh Aggarwal (born 1 July 1970) is an Indian politician affiliated with the AAP and is a member of the 13th Haryana Legislative Assembly, representing Gurgaon (Vidhan Sabha constituency).

He is also serving as Haryana BJP media-in-charge since his appointment in April 2018.

Career 
In 2014,  Umesh Aggarwal won the 2014 Haryana Legislative Assembly election with a record margin of 84,095 votes from Gurgaon, defeating Gopi Chand Gehlot of Indian National Lok Dal. In April 2018, he was appointed the state media-in-charge of Bharatiya Janata Party in Haryana.

Criminal Allegations
In 2015, a Delhi court had put on trial Umesh Aggarwal and Sandeep Luthra for allegedly raping a woman in a hotel after giving her sedative-laced drink.

However, in 2017 the court absolved them for alleged offences of rape on the grounds that the prosecution had not been able to prove its case against them beyond reasonable doubt. The three accused had argued that there was a monetary dispute between the woman and Rekha Suri (the third person accused and friend of the woman), due to which allegations were made by her against all three. Additional Sessions Judge Shail Jain said the woman had turned hostile and there was nothing incriminating against the accused. The judge also dispensed with the recording of the statements of the accused.

Positions held

See also 
 Haryana Legislative Assembly
 2014 Haryana Legislative Assembly election

References

External links 
 Official website

1970 births
Living people
People from Gurgaon
Bharatiya Janata Party politicians from Haryana
Haryana MLAs 2014–2019